Robert Fitzroy Pierce (born October 17, 1978) is an American baseball coach and former player. He most recently served as head coach of the Purdue University Fort Wayne from the 2009 season to 2019. He played at UNLV, Central Arizona, and New Mexico State. With Central Arizona, he played in the 1999 JUCO World Series. He began his coaching career as an assistant with Central Arizona for one season before becoming an assistant at Arkansas–Little Rock. Two seasons later, he became head coach at NCAA Division II Metro State before accepting the same job at IPFW. On July 3, 2019, Pierce stepped down as the head coach at Purdue Fort Wayne.

Head coaching record

References

1978 births
Little Rock Trojans baseball coaches
Central Arizona Vaqueros baseball coaches
Central Arizona Vaqueros baseball players
Living people
Purdue Fort Wayne Mastodons baseball coaches
Metro State Roadrunners baseball coaches
New Mexico State Aggies baseball players
UNLV Rebels baseball players
Place of birth missing (living people)